Peru is a city in LaSalle County, Illinois, United States. The population was 9,896 at the 2020 census, down from 10,295 at the 2010 census. It is part of the Ottawa, IL Micropolitan Statistical Area.  Peru and its twin city, LaSalle, make up the core of Illinois Valley.

History

The city's first settler was John Hays, who arrived in 1830. The city was organized as a borough in 1838, incorporated as a village February 25, 1845, and incorporated as a city on March 13, 1851. The original plat was between West Street, 4th Street, and East Street (now Pine Street).

River City (1831–1933)

Since the first steamboat Traveler reached Peru in 1831, the city had high hopes of being the western terminus for the Illinois & Michigan Canal. LaSalle won that designation, but Peru became a busy steamboat port at the head of navigation on the Illinois River. Captain McCormick was involved in the Five Day Line, making record fast trips between Peru and St. Louis, Missouri. Senator Gilson reported to land surveyor, Grenville Dodge, that the town would soon outstrip Chicago due to its favorable location along the river and railroads.

Water Street was a thin ribbon pressed between the bluff and the river, leading to the growth eastward of a large industrial district. Developed along the river and the canal, it was served by the Rock Island Railroad and Chicago Burlington and Quincy. These important transportation routes, along with coal mining in at least four mines lasting from 1857 until 1949, were the basis for Peru's rise to an industrial center. Many entrepreneurs grew into prominent businessmen and advanced the interests of Peru and the region. Prominent companies from that time included Maze Lumber, Maze Nails, Peru Plow and Wheel Works, Huse and Loomis Ice Co, Brunner Foundry, Star Union Brewery, Hebel Brewery, Illinois Zinc (Peru and LaSalle were sometimes referred to as "Zinc City") and many others. Peru's citizens were intent on improving their town, so far as constructing a plank road, northwest of town, a toll road meant to reach Dixon, Illinois.

Peru's story became a story of two levels. The story of Water Street and the bottoms, and the town growing above the bluff. Peru tried hard to link the two. For example, the Peru Horse and Dummy Railroad was driven to dissolution by the city's impossible mandate that it create a loop from Water Street to the upper bluff.

Clock City (1884–1980)

In 1884, Stahlberg started the United Clock Company in Peru. Shortly afterward, it went bankrupt and was reorganized with the help of Frederick William Matthiessen as the Western Clock Company. By 1905 it had grown into a national company, producing over 1 million alarm clocks per year. In 1909, they trademarked "Westclox". In 1917 they became a model for workers' benefits, one of the early companies to pay life insurance and have a safety committee. Later on, they limited the work week, constructed a company park with a tennis court and horseshoe courts, developed workers' housing, and established a school for watchmakers with provision for scholarships. In 1935 it was the safest company in the nation, with 11 million hours without a lost time accident.

During World War II the company made mechanical fuses for the government and had more than 600 of its employees enter the armed forces.  At its height it manufactured nearly 2 million clocks and watches annually and employed over 4,000 persons. It closed the Peru factory in 1980; the loss of jobs caused a rapid decline in population in LaSalle and Peru.

Today the old Westclox Administration Building is now the headquarter for the Carus Corporation and the rest of the Westclox complex is being redeveloped into a commercial center. The building is also home to the Westclox Museum.

Geography

The city is also the western terminus of the historic Illinois and Michigan Canal. Before the Illinois Waterway was constructed, the Illinois River was navigable only up to Peru. Peru has a twin city on its eastern edge, LaSalle.

Climate

Demographics

As of the 2020 census, there were 9,896 people, 4,482 households, and 2,760 families residing in the city. The racial makeup of the city was 86.86% White, 1.31% African American, 0.21% Native American, 1.75% Asian, 0.03% Pacific Islander, 2.68% from other races, and 7.15% from two or more races. Hispanic or Latino of any race were 9.43% of the population.

There were 4,482 households, out of which 24.0% had children under the age of 18 living with them, 47.8% were married couples living together, 11.0% had a female householder with no husband present, and 38.4% were non-families. 34.6% of all households were made up of individuals, and 17.0% had someone living alone who was 65 years of age or older. The average household size was 2.12 and the average family size was 2.64.

In the city the population was spread out, with 19.5% under the age of 18, 6.2% from 18 to 24, 21.1% from 25 to 44, 27.2% from 45 to 64, and 26.1% who were 65 years of age or older. The median age was 49.2 years. For every 100 females, there were 84.4 males. For every 100 females age 18 and over, there were 84.6 males.

The median income for a household in the city was $52,635, and the median income for a family was $73,477. Males had a median income of $50,645 versus $24,706 for females. The per capita income for the city was $34,268. About 6.3% of families and 11.3% of the population were below the poverty line, including 22.9% of those under age 18 and 3.2% of those age 65 or over.

Economy

There are a number of business districts in Peru. The largest is at the intersection of I-80 and IL-251. Then there are three smaller districts along the US-6 Corridor, including Peru's downtown. The largest employers in Peru are the Peru Mall, the Illinois Valley Community Hospital, Walmart, James Hardie, Officemax, the American Nickeloid, Liberty Village, Double D Express, Heritage Manor Nursing Home, Eakas, Target, and Horizon Industries.

Peru is the home of at least three very old companies. It is the national headquarters of American Nickeloid, started in 1898, and the W.H. Maze Co, dealing in lumber and nails, which started the year the Illinois and Michigan Canal opened in 1848. Maze Nails is one of America's last remaining nail makers. Peru is home to the offices of Carus Chemical Company, started in 1915, today one of the largest manufacturers of potassium permanganate in the world.

In 2021, the DuPage Pistol Shrimp baseball team relocated from Lisle, Illinois to Peru, becoming the Illinois Valley Pistol Shrimp. The Pistol Shrimp, a member of the collegiate Prospect League, will play their first season in Peru during the summer of 2021.

Education
Schools serving Peru include:

Elementary schools
 Peru Public Schools
 Peru Catholic School
 LaSalle-Peru Christian School

High schools
 LaSalle-Peru Township High School
 St. Bede Academy
 LaSalle-Peru Christian School

Transportation
The city operates Illinois Valley Regional Airport.

Notable people
 John Virginius Bennes, architect
 William P. Bettendorf and Joseph W. Bettendorf, industrialists
 Zez Confrey, composer and pianist
 Franklin Corwin, US congressman
 Grenville Dodge, Civil War General and Transcontinental Railroad Constructor
 Gary G. Dahl, politician
 Mike Goff, offensive lineman for the Kansas City Chiefs
 Ken Gorgal, halfback for the Green Bay Packers
 Charles F. Gunther, inventor of the caramel
 J. A. Happ, professional baseball pitcher for the St. Louis Cardinals
 Wilhelmina Kott, oldest person ever from Illinois; born in Peru
 Donold Lourie, businessman, government official, and college football player
 Thomas Lynch, pitcher for the 19th-century Chicago White Stockings; born in Peru
 Russ Meyer, pitcher for six Major League Baseball teams
 Esther Hobart Morris, first woman justice of the peace in United States; served in Wyoming
 Maud Powell, world-renowned violinist and recipient of a Grammy Lifetime Achievement Award; born in Peru, she gave her first performance at Turn Hall and has been honored with a statue in her home town
 Thomas E. G. Ransom, Civil War general, lived in Peru
 Howard C. Ryan, Chief Justice of the Illinois Supreme Court
 William Donald Scherzer, inventor of the Scherzer Rolling Lift Bridges
 Joseph P. Stremlau, farmer and Illinois state legislator
 Stuart Streuver, archaeologist and anthropologist
 Frank Vlastnik, theater and television actor

References

External links

 City website

 
Cities in LaSalle County, Illinois
Populated places established in 1838
1838 establishments in Illinois
Cities in Illinois
Ottawa, IL Micropolitan Statistical Area